Jure is a South Slavic masculine given name found in Slovenia and Croatia.

It is cognate to the names Juraj and Jurij, in turn cognate to George in English.

It may refer to:

 Jure Balažič (born 1980), Slovenian basketball player
 Jure Balkovec (born 1994), Slovenian football player
 Jure Bilić (1922–2006), Yugoslav politician
 Jure Bogdan (born 1955), Croatian bishop 
 Jure Brkljača (born 1994), Croatian singer
 Jure Čolak (born 1989), Croatian-German football player
 Jure Detela (1951–1992) was a Slovene poet, writer, and essayist
 Jure Dobelšek (born 1984), Slovenian handball player 
 Jure Dolenc (1908–1963), American film actor of Slovene descent
 Jure Dolenec (born 1988), Slovenian handball player
 Jure Francetić (1912–1942), Croatian fascist
 Jure Godler (born 1984), Slovenian writer, actor, composer and comedian
 Jure Golčer (born 1977), Slovenian cyclist
 Jure Grando (1579–1656), Istrian villager
 Jure Guvo (born 1977), Croatian football player
 Jure Ivanković (born 1985), Bosnian football manager
 Jure Kocjan (born 1984), Slovenian road racing cyclist
 Jure Košir (born 1972), Slovenian alpine skier
 Jure Lalić (born 1986), Croatian basketball player
 Jure Lenarčič (born 1990), Slovenian canoeist
 Jure Leskovec, Slovenian computer scientist
 Jure Matjašič (born 1992), Slovenian football player
 Jure Meglič (born 1984), Slovenian slalom canoeist 
 Jure Milina (born 1987), Croatian football player
 Jure Močnik (born 1985), Slovenian basketball player
 Jure Obšivač (born 1990), Croatian football player
 Jure Pavic (born 1975), Croatian football player
 Jure Pavlič (born 1963), Yugoslav cyclist
 Jure Pavlović (born 1985), Croatian film director
 Jure Pelivan (1928–2014), Bosnian Croat politician and economist
 Jure Primorac (born 1981), Croatian-born French football player
 Jure Radelj (born 1977), Slovenian ski jumper
 Jure Radić (disambiguation), multiple people
 Jure Ritlop (born 1995), Slovenian basketball player 
 Jure Robič (1965–2010), Slovenian cyclist and soldier
 Jure Rupnik, Slovenian cyclist
 Jure Šinkovec (born 1985), Slovenian ski jumper 
 Jure Šterk (1937–2009) was a Slovenian long-distance sailor
 Jure Velepec (born 1965), Slovenian biathlete
 Jure Zdovc (born 1966), Slovenian basketball player and coach
 Jure Zrimšek (born 1982), Slovenian cyclist
 Jure Zupan, Slovenian physicist

Slovene masculine given names
Croatian masculine given names